The Defence Safety Authority (DSA) is an agency of the United Kingdom Ministry of Defence which regulates safety and investigates accidents in the UK's Armed Forces.

The DSA was launched on 1 April 2015 and brings together the Defence Safety and Environment Authority (DSEA), Military Aviation Authority (MAA) and Defence Fire Safety Regulator (DFSR), to form a single common managed organization under the leadership of a 3-star Director General (DG) – DG DSA. The Director-General is also the head of the Defence Accident Investigation Branch (DAIB) (Formerly the Military Air Accident Investigation Branch (MilAAIB) and the Land Accident Investigation Team (LAIT)).

Directors-General
The Directors-General have been:
The Directors-General have been:
2015–2017: Air Marshal Richard Garwood
2017–2019: Lieutenant-General Richard Felton
2019–2022: Air Marshal Sue Gray
2022–present: Air Marshal Stephen Shell

References

External links
 

Aviation organisations based in the United Kingdom
Aviation safety in the United Kingdom
British military aviation
Defence agencies of the United Kingdom